Kenya Commercial Bank Sports Club, commonly known as KCB, and nicknamed Sidwedwe, is a Kenyan multi-sport club based in Nairobi currently playing in the Kenyan Premier League.

History
Owned by the Kenya Commercial Bank, the club's football team played for several years in the Kenyan Premier League, but were relegated at the end of the 2015 season after finishing in 15th place. They were promoted again in 2018 after their 2–0 victory against Talanta made it impossible to finish outside of the promotion places.

Kenya Commercial Bank also has rugby, volleyball and basketball teams, all of which play in their respective men's top-flight leagues of Kenya. In addition, their volleyball section has a women's team, which is among the most successful ones in Kenya. KCB has its own facilities in Ruaraka, Nairobi, which the rugby team uses as their home ground.

Aside from other sports, KCB also runs a chess club.

Departments

Football

The football club was founded in 1993. In 1996 it won the Nairobi Provincial League and was promoted to the Nationwide League. Two years later it won promotion to the Premier League.

Honours
 Kenyan Transparency Cup: (1)
 2004

Rugby

KCB Rugby section was established in 1989 based on Kenya Breweries team which was disbanded that year.

Honours
 Kenya Cup: (3)
 2005, 2006, 2007

Volleyball

KCB has both men's and ladies's sections. At the 2007 FIVB Women's World Cup four KCB players played for Kenyan national team

Basketball

KCB's basketball section is known as  Kenya Commercial Bank Lions (or KCB Lions). It won the Kenyan Basketball Premier League in 2001 and 2007. Their women's team in known as KCB Lioness.

References

External links
KCB Rugby Football Club
Africabasket

Kenyan Premier League clubs
Football clubs in Kenya
Kenyan volleyball clubs
Basketball teams in Kenya
Sport in Nairobi
1993 establishments in Kenya
Sports clubs established in 1993
Financial services association football clubs in Kenya